Chavasse is the surname of:

 Chavasse family in the West Midlands, an originally Catholic British family originating in southeast France in the 17th century
 Christopher Maude Chavasse OBE MC, Bishop of Rochester and Olympic athlete, son of Bishop Francis James Chavasse
 Francis Bernard Chavasse MC ophthalmologist of Rodney St. Liverpool and Harley St. London; edited Worth's Squint
 Francis James Chavasse, Bishop of Liverpool and founder of St Peter's College, Oxford
 Kendal Chavasse, DSO and bar (1904 - 2001), Irish-born officer in the British Army, served in World War II
 Noel Godfrey Chavasse VC & Bar MC, First World War medic and twice winner of the Victoria Cross, son of Bishop Francis James Chavasse